The German torpedo boat T9 was one of a dozen Type 35 torpedo boats built for the Kriegsmarine (German Navy) during the late 1930s. Completed in July 1940, the boat participated in an abortive attempt to attack several convoys off the Scottish coast in November. T9 was placed in reserve in August 1941 and was reactivated in June 1942 for duties in France. She participated in an unsuccessful attempt to escort a blockade runner through the Bay of Biscay in early 1943 and was then transferred to the Torpedo School in September. In mid-1944 the boat returned to active duty and was assigned to the Baltic Sea area. She escorted a bombardment mission in November  and was damaged by bombers in East Prussia in early 1945. T9 was sunk near Kiel, Germany, during an air raid on 3 May.

Design and description
The Type 35 was an unsuccessful attempt by the Kriegsmarine to design a fast, ocean-going torpedo boat that did not exceed the  displacement limit of the London Naval Treaty for ships that counted against the national tonnage limit. Their crew numbered 119 officers and sailors.

As built, the Type 35 class mounted a single  SK C/32 gun on the stern. Anti-aircraft defense was provided by a single  SK C/30 anti-aircraft gun superfiring over the 10.5 cm gun and a pair of  C/30 guns on the bridge wings. They carried six above-water  torpedo tubes in two triple mounts and could also carry 30 mines (or 60 if the weather was good). Many boats exchanged the 3.7 cm gun for another 2 cm gun, depth charges and minesweeping paravanes before completion. Late-war additions were limited to the installation of radar, radar detectors and additional AA guns, usually at the expense of the aft torpedo tube mount.

Construction and career
T9 was ordered on 29 June 1936 from Schichau, laid down at their Elbing, East Prussia, shipyard on 24 November 1936 as yard number 1393, launched on 3 November 1938 and commissioned on 4 July 1940. The boat was working up until August when she began convoy escort duties in the Baltic Sea. By November T9 had transferred to Norway. German aerial reconnaissance had located two coastal convoys in early November that the Kriegsmarine estimated would pass Kinnaird Head, Scotland, during the early morning of 7 November. The British had extended their minefields further north unbeknownst to the Germans and T6 struck a mine shortly after midnight and sank. T7 and T8 rescued the survivors and the operation was abandoned. T9 began a refit in March in Kiel that lasted until July. The boat was reduced to reserve on 15 August.

T9 was recommissioned on June 1942 and was working up until August. On 15–19 August she was one of the escorts, together with T12 and the destroyer , for the minelayer  from Kiel to Narvik, Norway. T9 began a refit at Schichau on 9 May that lasted until August. The boat was then transferred to the Torpedo School as a training ship. On the night of 23/24 November, the flotilla screened the heavy cruiser  as she shelled Soviet positions during the evacuation of Sworbe, on the island of Ösel. T9 was damaged by bombs in Danzig on 8 March 1945. Her wreck was demolished by depth charges on 10 December.

Notes

References

External links
Type 35 on German Navy.de

Type 35 torpedo boats
1938 ships